Binghamimyia is a genus of tachinid flies in the family Tachinidae.

Species
Binghamimyia reclinata Townsend, 1919

Distribution
Peru.

References

Exoristinae
Diptera of South America
Tachinidae genera
Taxa named by Charles Henry Tyler Townsend
Monotypic Brachycera genera